Melissa Young (born July 3, 1980), known professionally as Kid Sister, is an American rapper based in Chicago, Illinois. She is known for her single "Pro Nails", which features Kanye West, and for her work as a member of the British music collective Sault.

Biography
Kid Sister was born Melisa Young on July 3, 1980 in Markham, Illinois. She started to rap in October 2006, becoming an MC at monthly dance parties hosted by DJ duo Flosstradamus (Josh Young, of Flosstradamus, is Melisa's brother), who were featured in MTV's My Block that same year. She made URB'''s "The Next 1000" cover in April 2007, and was signed to DJ A-Trak's label, Fool's Gold, who released her first single "Pro Nails", which features Kanye West. Kid Sister later signed with Downtown Records, who re-released "Pro Nails" to critical acclaim.

Kid Sister also appears on Tittsworth's "WTF", from his debut album 12 Steps, with Pase Rock. She had also finished a mixtape with A-Trak.
In Fall 2009, Kid Sister finished recording her debut studio album. The title was changed from Dream Date to Ultraviolet. The album was produced by the likes of Rusko, The Count & Sinden, XXXChange, and Brian Kennedy, and includes a collaboration with English singer Estelle titled "First Ladies", which is a remake of Queen Latifah's 1989 acclaimed track "Ladies First" from her debut album All Hail the Queen.

Her single "Control" is featured in the 2009 music video game DJ Hero, combined with Rihanna's "Disturbia". The album's lead single was "Right Hand Hi", produced by Steve Angello and Sebastian Ingrosso of house DJ group Swedish House Mafia.

"I think a lot of people are going to be surprised with the fact that there's a bunch of raw hip-hop records on there," said A-Trak. "It's not all up tempo clubby stuff. I think a lot of people are going to be impressed with her growth also because when she made a lot of the records that people have heard by now, she was just starting to rap."

In late 2010, Kid Sister released a mixtape titled Kiss Kiss Kiss and in 2014 she released a second mixtape, Dusk2Dawn: The Diary of Jane Jupiter in which she tackled more serious, personal subjects. In 2016, she began working on her second album with British producer Inflo. Kid Sister is a member of the British music collective Sault, along with Inflo and British singer-songwriter Cleo Sol.

Personal life
Kid Sister's ethnic background includes African American, Native American, and Caucasian. In numerous interviews and magazine articles, she has revealed that she has struggled financially for years before becoming West's protégé. She has also admitted to being 215 pounds at one point in her life. She continued in the same interview to state that she has been "thick" her whole life, but explained that this has had no bearing on her self-esteem, because at her core she is not a passive person.

Kid Sister has a degree in film from Columbia College Chicago and worked on two independent feature films during her studies: 9/11 drama The Guys (2002) starring Sigourney Weaver and Anthony LaPaglia; and Best Thief in the World (2003) starring Mary-Louise Parker and Audra McDonald. Kid Sister for a time concurrently worked for the retail chain Bath & Body Works, Little Threads, a children's clothing store, and Wild Hare, a reggae bar in Wrigleyville.

Discography
Albums
 Ultraviolet (2009)

Mixtapes
 Kiss Kiss Kiss (2011)
 DUSK2DAWN: The Diary of Jane Jupiter (2014)

EPs
 Kiss & Tell (2011)

Singles

Solo

As featured performer

Awards and nominations
BET Awards
2008: Best Female Hip-Hop Artist (nominated)

References

External links
 
 Review by Spin''
 Interview with Kid Sister at The Music Fix prior to the UK release of Ultraviolet
 Venus Zine Presents: Kid Sister

1980 births
American women rappers
African-American women rappers
Living people
Midwest hip hop musicians
People from Markham, Illinois
Rappers from Chicago
Universal Music Group artists
Songwriters from Illinois
African-American songwriters
21st-century American rappers
21st-century American women musicians
American women in electronic music
Downtown Records artists
21st-century African-American women
21st-century African-American musicians
20th-century African-American people
20th-century African-American women
21st-century women rappers